Inayat Khan (born 19 October 1922) was a Pakistani cricketer who played first-class cricket from 1941 to 1950, and played for Pakistan in the years before Pakistan played Test cricket.

Cricket career
Khan was born in Lahore. His father Saleh Mohammad played first-class cricket as an all-rounder for Muslims in the Bombay Quadrangular and the Lahore Tournament between 1912 and 1930. 

Khan was a right-handed batsman and right-arm fast-medium bowler. He scored his only first-class century, 100 retired out, for North Zone in the Zonal Quadrangular Tournament in February 1946. His captain, the Nawab of Pataudi, declared when Khan reached his hundred, but when both teams had returned to the dressing rooms the umpires pointed out that under the Laws at the time no team could declare on the first day of a three-day game. North Zone had to return to the wicket but Khan and Pataudi, the two not out batsmen, chose to retire. An economical bowler, Khan took figures of 55–29–59–3 for Sind against Bombay in the Ranji Trophy in November 1944.

Khan was selected to play for Pakistan in the first of two matches against Ceylon in March 1950. He scored a duck in the first match, which Pakistan won by an innings, and was not selected for the second. He played no further first-class cricket.

References

External links
 

1922 births
Possibly living people
Pakistani cricketers
Cricketers from Lahore
Northern India cricketers
Muslims cricketers
Punjab (Pakistan) cricketers 
Sindh cricketers